Aher Simon Uguak (born May 24, 1998) is a Canadian professional basketball player for Edmonton Stingers of the Canadian Elite Basketball League (CEBL) And the Niners Chemnitz of the Basketball Bundesliga (BBL) . He previously played for the Loyola Chicago.

Early life and high school career
Uguak was born in Egypt after his family had fled their native South Sudan to escape civil war. When he was eight months old, his family settled in Canada. Uguak started out playing Gridiron football but switched to basketball at age 7, inspired by the achievements of his cousin Luol Deng. He attended Harry Ainlay High School in Edmonton, Alberta. Uguak led his team to back-to-back provincial titles. He committed to playing college basketball for New Mexico. He was the highest rated prospect in his class from Alberta.

College career
As a freshman at New Mexico, Uguak averaged 1.2 points per game before leaving the program. For his sophomore season, he transferred to Loyola (Illinois) and sat out for one year due to transfer rules. As a sophomore, Uguak was a regular starter, averaging 5.8 points and 3.5 rebounds per game. He averaged 5.7 points and 3.9 rebounds per game as a junior. Uguak improved offensively during his senior season. On January 2, 2021, he recorded a career-high 26 points and seven rebounds in a 57–49 win over North Texas. Uguak was named to the Third Team All-Missouri Valley Conference (MVC) and the MVC All-Defensive Team. As a senior, he averaged 7.3 points and 3.9 rebounds per game, shooting 61.9 percent from the field. Following the season, Uguak took advantage of the extra season of eligibility granted by the NCAA due to the COVID-19 pandemic. He was named to the MVC All-Defensive Team.

Professional career
On July 25, 2022, he has signed with Niners Chemnitz of the Basketball Bundesliga (BBL).

On March 2, 2023, he has signed with Edmonton Stingers of the Canadian Elite Basketball League (CEBL).

Career statistics

College

|-
| style="text-align:left;"| 2016–17
| style="text-align:left;"| New Mexico
| 19 || 2 || 7.4 || .350 || .125 || .533 || .7 || .4 || .3 || .1 || 1.2
|-
| style="text-align:left;"| 2017–18
| style="text-align:left;"| Loyola
| style="text-align:center;" colspan="11"|  Redshirt
|-
| style="text-align:left;"| 2018–19
| style="text-align:left;"| Loyola
| 34 || 28 || 25.1 || .504 || .200 || .687 || 3.5 || 1.0 || .9 || .2 || 5.8
|-
| style="text-align:left;"| 2019–20
| style="text-align:left;"| Loyola
| 32 || 31 || 24.0 || .517 || .158 || .628 || 3.9 || 1.9 || .5 || .1 || 5.7
|-
| style="text-align:left;"| 2020–21
| style="text-align:left;"| Loyola
| 31 || 31 || 24.5 || .619 || .333 || .764 || 3.9 || 1.2 || .9 || .0 || 7.3
|- class="sortbottom"
| style="text-align:center;" colspan="2"| Career
| 116 || 92 || 21.7 || .539 || .238 || .674 || 3.3 || 1.2 || .7 || .1 || 5.4

Personal life
Uguak's younger brother, Lwal, plays college football as a defensive lineman at UConn. His cousin, Luol Deng, played in the National Basketball Association.

References

External links
Loyola Ramblers bio
New Mexico Lobos bio
Niners Chemnitz bio
Edmonton Stingers bio

1998 births
Living people
Basketball people from Alberta
Canadian men's basketball players
Canadian people of South Sudanese descent
Canadian sportspeople of African descent
Loyola Ramblers men's basketball players
New Mexico Lobos men's basketball players
NINERS Chemnitz players
Small forwards
Sportspeople from Edmonton
Sportspeople of South Sudanese descent